The Philippine small-disked frog (Limnonectes parvus) is a species of frog in the family Dicroglossidae.
It is endemic to the Philippines.

Its natural habitats are subtropical or tropical moist lowland forest, subtropical or tropical moist montane forest, and rivers.
It is threatened by habitat loss.

References

Limnonectes
Amphibians of the Philippines
Endemic fauna of the Philippines
Taxonomy articles created by Polbot
Amphibians described in 1920